Ezequiel González (born January 24, 1983) is an Argentine footballer who currently plays for Persiba Bantul.

Honours

Club honors
Persiba Bantul
Liga Indonesia Premier Division : 2010-11

References

External links
 Profile at Liga Indonesia
 

1983 births
Living people
Argentine footballers
Persiba Bantul players
Semen Padang F.C. players
Argentine expatriate footballers
Argentine expatriate sportspeople in Indonesia
Expatriate footballers in Indonesia
Liga 1 (Indonesia) players
Indonesian Premier Division players
Estudiantes de La Plata footballers
Argentine Primera División players
Association football forwards
Footballers from La Plata